In graph theory, a part of mathematics, a -partite graph is a graph whose vertices are (or can be) partitioned into  different independent sets. Equivalently, it is a graph that can be colored with  colors, so that no two endpoints of an edge have the same color. When  these are the bipartite graphs, and when  they are called the tripartite graphs.

Bipartite graphs may be recognized in polynomial time but, for any  it is NP-complete, given an uncolored graph, to test whether it is -partite.
However, in some applications of graph theory, a -partite graph may be given as input to a computation with its coloring already determined; this can happen when the sets of vertices in the graph represent different types of objects. For instance, folksonomies have been modeled mathematically by tripartite graphs in which the three sets of vertices in the graph represent users of a system, resources that the users are tagging, and tags that the users have applied to the resources.

A complete -partite graph is a -partite graph in which there is an edge between every pair of vertices from different independent sets. These graphs are described by notation with a capital letter  subscripted by a sequence of the sizes of each set in the partition. For instance,  is the complete tripartite graph of a regular octahedron, which can be partitioned into three independent sets each consisting of two opposite vertices.
The Turán graphs are the special case of complete multipartite graphs in which each two independent sets differ in size by at most one vertex.
Complete -partite graphs, complete multipartite graphs, and their complement graphs, the cluster graphs, are special cases of cographs, and can be recognized in polynomial time even when the partition is not supplied as part of the input.

References

Graph families